van der Vleuten is a Dutch surname. Notable bearers include:

Jos van der Vleuten (1943–2011), cyclist
Maarten van der Vleuten (born 1967), record producer
Maikel van der Vleuten (born 1988), show jumper rider

See also
Annemiek van Vleuten (born 1982), cyclist

Surnames of Dutch origin